Niall Ó Brolcháin (born 14 April 1965) is a former Irish Green Party politician who served as a Senator for the Agricultural Panel from December 2009 to April 2011. He served as Mayor of Galway from 2006 to 2007.

Galway City Council
He was elected in June 2004 with 10.93% (881 votes) of the vote. His victory was one of the closest of the elections, beating Fianna Fáil's Tom Cox by 40 votes.

He worked on various campaigns ranging from Quality Bus Corridors to better sewage treatment and waste management facilities. He has worked on many local committees including the city's Economic Development Group and Environment Strategic Policy Committee, and became Galway's first Green Party Mayor in June 2006. He opened the Galway City Museum to the public. He is a campaigner for the Western Railway Corridor, Light rail for Galway and water quality issues.

Prior to his campaign for City Council, he ran for Dáil Éireann in the Galway West constituency at the 2002 general election receiving 4.4% (2,193 votes) of the vote but was not elected. In February 2005, he was nominated as Galway West's Green Party candidate for the 2007 general election, but he failed to be elected getting 5.5% (3,026 votes) of the vote.

He failed to get elected by just 26 votes in another cliffhanger in the new 5 seat electoral area of Galway City West in what was a very poor election for the Green Party nationally. He got 8.0% (706 votes) of the vote.

Seanad Éireann
He was elected to the Seanad as a Senator for the Agricultural Panel on 14 December 2009 in a by-election caused by Alan Kelly's election to the European Parliament. Ó Brolchain was nominated as the Green Party candidate and received the backing of coalition partners, Fianna Fáil. The electorate consisted of members of the Dáil and Seanad. He won 119 votes out of 205.

He lost his seat at the 2011 Seanad election.

After politics
He works as a research associate at the Insight Centre for Data Analytics (formerly DERI) in NUI Galway.

References

1965 births
Living people
Academics of the University of Galway
Green Party (Ireland) senators
Mayors of Galway
Members of the 23rd Seanad
Politicians from County Galway
Local councillors in Galway (city)